Rokle is a municipality and village in Chomutov District in the Ústí nad Labem Region of the Czech Republic. It has about 400 inhabitants.

Administrative parts
Villages of Hradec, Krásný Dvoreček, Nová Víska u Rokle and Želina are administrative parts of Rokle.

Economy
Hradec substation is located in the municipality.

References

Villages in Chomutov District